Yasuhiro Tanaka (田中 靖洋, born June 21, 1987 in Komatsu, Ishikawa) is a Japanese professional baseball pitcher for the Chiba Lotte Marines in Japan's Nippon Professional Baseball. He formally played for the Saitama Seibu Lions.

External links

NBP

1987 births
Living people
Baseball people from Ishikawa Prefecture
Japanese expatriate baseball players in Australia
Nippon Professional Baseball pitchers
Saitama Seibu Lions players
Chiba Lotte Marines players
Melbourne Aces players